Olivia Pichardo is a baseball player for Brown University. She is the first woman to play Division I baseball.

Early life 
Pichardo has played baseball since kindergarten. She played varsity baseball in high school. She also played on the Next Level Baseball travel team, as well as the Atlantic Collegiate Baseball League's New York Crush. She also interned for the New York Mets in their amateur scouting department.

College career 
In November 2022, as a freshman, Pichardo became the first woman named to an NCAA Division I baseball roster, when she made the Brown University team as a walk-on. In March 2023, she made history again by being the first woman to have a plate appearance, when she pinch-hit.

She is a utility player.

International career 
In 2022, she was on the roster for the USA Baseball Women’s National Team, where she played in a five-game series against Canada. She served as both an outfielder and right-handed pitcher. She made four starts in the outfield and one as a pitcher.

Personal 
Pichardo is from Queens, New York.

References

American female baseball players
Female baseball players
Women's baseball
Women's baseball in the United States